Richard Charles Poillon (August 13, 1920 – November 14, 1994) was an American football halfback in the National Football League (NFL) for the Washington Redskins.  He scored a career 247 points and was the Redskins' lead scorer for three years. Poillon was voted one of the Redskins' "Top 100 players" of all time by a poll in the Washington Post. He held the old record of 93 yards (on a lateral) Pick Off, Run On vs. the Philadelphia Eagles set on November 21, 1948 (broken December 26, 1987).  He attended Canisius College.

External links 

1920 births
1994 deaths
Sportspeople from Queens, New York
Players of American football from New York City
American football halfbacks
Canisius Golden Griffins football players
Washington Redskins players